Moshe Hillel Hirsch (born 1936) is the Rosh Yeshiva of Yeshivas Slabodka in Bnei Brak, Israel. He is a native of the United States who studied at Beth Medrash Govoha in Lakewood under the Talmudic tutelage of Rabbi Aharon Kotler.

He is the son-in-law of Mordechai Shulman, whom he succeeded as Rosh Yeshiva in Yeshivas Slabodka, who was the son-in-law of Issac Sher, who was the son-in-law of the Alter of Slabodka.

Hirsch is very involved in the halakhic leadership of Haredi Judaism.
Despite living in Israel, Hirsch is quite well known on the haredi rabbinical speaking circuit in America  Hirsch eulogized Noach Weinberg, well known for founding Aish Hatorah, for an English-speaking audience.

References

External links

 chareidi.shemayisrael.com

Israeli Rosh yeshivas
Haredi rabbis in Israel
Beth Medrash Govoha alumni
American Haredi rabbis
American emigrants to Israel
Rabbis in Bnei Brak
Academic staff of Slabodka yeshiva
1936 births
Living people